There were several independent candidates who contested the 1995 Manitoba provincial election.

Candidates
Dauphin: Carey Contois
Inkster: Scott Kowall
Interlake: Darryl Sutherland
Portage la Prairie: Ralph Jackson
St. Boniface: Ivan Lecuyer
Sturgeon Creek: Richard McIntyre
Swan River: Nelson Contois
Transcona: Jack Lang

1995